City of the Sun is a novel by Juliana Maio, published by Greenleaf Book Group in March 2014. The novel, which blends historical fiction with spy fiction and romantic fiction, is set in Cairo, Egypt in 1941 during the North Africa Campaign of World War II. Though a work of fiction, it centers around true historical events and "connects the root of much of today's turmoil in the Middle East with the Axis-Allied struggle for control of the Suez Canal and the early history of the Muslim Brotherhood."

The author was born to a Jewish family in Heliopolis, a suburb of Cairo. Her family was expelled in 1956 during the Suez Crisis, when she was three years old. Maio grew up and was educated in Paris, France before her family emigrated to the United States.

References

External links
 

Novels set in Cairo
2014 American novels
American historical novels
American spy novels
American romance novels